Salem Holland Ford (February 14, 1896 – June 16, 1976) was an American football halfback. He played college football at the University of Louisville from 1914 to 1916 and professional football in the National Football League (NFL) for the Louisville Brecks in 1922 and 1923.

Early years
Ford was born in 1896 in Louisville, Kentucky, and attended Louisville Male High School. He attended the University of Louisville and played for the Louisville football team from 1914 to 1916. In 1914, he set a Louisville record with a 48-yard field goal by dropkick. He served in the Army during World War I. His father, Arthur Younger Ford, served as president of the University of Louisville from 1921 to 1926.

Professional football
In October 1922, six year after his final year of college football, Ford was signed by the Louisville Brecks of the National Football League (NFL). He appeared in four NFL games during the 1922 and 1923 seasons.

Family and later years
Ford was married to Sarah Johnson Brashear in 1925; they had two daughters. After his football career ended, Ford worked for 38 years as a lumber buyer for the Mengel Co.  He retired in 1961 and died in 1976 at age 90 at Norton-Children's Hospitals in Louisville.

References

1896 births
1975 deaths
Louisville Brecks players
Players of American football from Louisville, Kentucky
Louisville Cardinals football players
People from Louisville, Kentucky
American football halfbacks